Qui comincia l'avventura, or Blonde in Black Leather in its English-language version, is a 1975 Italian  film. It stars  Claudia Cardinale and Monica Vitti.

Cast
 Monica Vitti: Miele
 Claudia Cardinale: Laura
 Ninetto Davoli: the acrobat / the angel / the devil
 Guido Leontini: Laura's husband

References

External links

1975 films
1970s Italian-language films
Films scored by Riz Ortolani
Films shot in Matera
1970s female buddy films
Italian buddy films
1970s Italian films